Ateleaspididae is a prehistoric jawless fish family in the class Osteostraci.

References

External links

Osteostraci
Prehistoric jawless fish families